Cameron Wayne Smith  (born 18 June 1983) is an Australian former professional rugby league footballer who played as a , spending his entire career with the Melbourne Storm in the National Rugby League (NRL).

An n international and Queensland State of Origin representative, Smith is regarded by some as one of the greatest players of all time. During his nineteen year career, Smith won the Dally M Medal as the NRL's player of the year in 2006 and 2017, the Golden Boot Award as the international player of the year in 2007 and 2017, and the NRL's Dally M Hooker of the Year on nine occasions. He was the captain of the Storm for fifteen years, during which time they won the 2012, 2017, and 2020 NRL Premierships, and also Australia and Queensland from 2012 until his retirement from representative matches in 2018.

Considered a future Immortal, Smith is currently the NRL's games record holder, with 430 matches played; he is the only player to have played over 400 matches. He is also the highest all-time points scorer in NRL history, having surpassed Hazem El Masri's 2,418 points on 12 April 2019. Smith also holds the NRL records for most goals kicked (1295), most tackles made (16917), most grand final points scored (44) and most wins (310).

Smith was appointed a Member of the Order of Australia (AM) in the 2019 Queen's Birthday Honours for his service to rugby league. He retired from professional rugby league in 2021.

Early life
Smith was born on 18 June 1983 in Logan, Queensland, Australia. He attended Marsden State High School.

Playing career

Early Career (2000–2001) 
After scoring 188 points for the Norths Devils in the Queensland Cup he moved up to the NRL with the Melbourne Storm club.

Joining the Storm (2002–2003) 
Smith's first two games for Melbourne were during the 2002 NRL season, both played at half-back (No.7). Returning to the Queensland Cup, he won the Norths Devils player of the year award in 2002. The following year he played as the Storm's hooker. In 2003 the Queensland rugby league team were without a specialist hooker. After experimenting with different players in the position for the first two matches of the 2003 State of Origin series and losing both, Smith was named at hooker (No.9) for the third match. For the next six years, no other player wore the number 9 for the Maroons until this run of 19 consecutive Origins was cut due to injury. He was named the Melbourne Storm's rookie of the year in 2003.

Early success and Representative selection (2005–2007) 

In 2005, Smith was named the Melbourne Storm's player of the year. The following year he first represented Australia and won the Dally M Medal. Also in Round 3 of 2006 Smith captained the club for the first time and in what became a very successful year for him as later that year he led the Storm to the 2006 NRL Grand Final. During the Grand Final, while the game was still in the balance, he was forced from the field with injury, which the Storm's loss has been largely attributed to.
At the Melbourne Storm awards night Smith was named the Storm's 2006 player of the year. 

Smith was selected to play for the Australian national team at hooker the 2007 ANZAC Test match victory against New Zealand. For the 2007 State of Origin series, Smith took out both the Wally Lewis Medal for player of the series and Ron Mcauliffe Medal for Queensland player of the series. He was also named the Melbourne Storm player of the year. Smith captained the Melbourne Storm in their 34–8 victory over the Manly-Warringah Sea Eagles in the 2007 NRL Grand Final.

Becoming captain (2008–2009) 
Smith became regular captain of the Melbourne Storm in 2008. Smith captained the Maroons for the entire 2008 State of Origin series due to the absence of regular captain Darren Lockyer. The Maroons won the series, despite losing the first match 18–10. In August 2008, Smith was named in the preliminary 46-man Kangaroos squad for the 2008 Rugby League World Cup, and in October 2008 he was selected in the final 24-man Australia squad. Cameron was suspended for two weeks in the 2008 finals series after a grapple tackle on Brisbane's Sam Thaiday. The suspension would have only been one week had he not have carried over points from a previous grapple tackle in round 1 of the year's competition. This meant he was suspended for Melbourne's 2008 grand final. Melbourne Storm CEO Brian Waldron and coach Craig Bellamy claimed the judiciary had made their minds up before Cameron's case was heard. The judiciary panel members then threatened to sue the club if the comments were not retracted. Cameron signed a four-year extension to his contract in December 2008, resulting in him being a contracted player through to the end of at least the 2012 season. His contract is rumoured to be partly funded by third party sponsors who do not contribute to the standard salary cap. He became the Melbourne Storm's most experienced playing player due to the retirement of Matt Geyer at the end of 2008. He became the last current Storm player in the squad who played under Mark Murray as well as the only one to have played in a season when the Storm did not make the finals due to their performance (the Storm finished 10th in 2002, the year Smith made his debut).

In April 2009, he was named in the preliminary 25 man squad to represent Queensland in the opening State of Origin match for 2009. He was selected for Australia in the one-off test match against New Zealand on 8 May 2009. In the preliminary final in which Melbourne defeated the Brisbane Broncos 40–10, he became Storm's highest ever point scorer, beating Matt Orford's record of 877. Smith led the Storm in their 2009 NRL Grand Final victory over the Parramatta Eels. At the end of the season, he joined the Kangaroos on their campaign to win the 2009 Four Nations tournament in England. He scored the try that saved Australia from losing in the opening match and also scored in the Kangaroos' victory against England in the final.

Many of Smith's club achievements between the years of 2006 and 2010 were later placed under an asterisk after the Melbourne Storm were stripped of all honours achieved in those years due to the discovery of the Melbourne Storm salary cap breach.

National captaincy and Premiership success (2010–2012) 
In 2010 he played in the 2010 World Club Challenge at halfback in the absence of his usual number 7 Cooper Cronk due to injury. Smith kicked 5 goals and was named man of the match. For the 2010 ANZAC Test victory, Smith was selected to play at hooker. For the first time since Game II of the 2003 Origin series, Smith wasn't wearing the number 9 for Queensland, after he failed to overcome the elbow injury he sustained playing in that test. He was replaced by Matt Ballin. In Round 26 of the 2010 NRL season Smith became the first Melbourne Storm player to reach 1,000 points after successfully converting Ryan Hinchcliffe's try. 

Smith played in the 42–0 thrashing of the Papua New Guinea national rugby league team during the 2010 Four Nations. It was a game where he converted 5 tries and scored once. He was later named man of the match.

Smith was named man-of-the-match in Queensland's win in Game I and later Game III of the 2011 State of Origin series, subsequently resulting in his naming as the Wally Lewis medal winning man-of-the-series. On 3 November 2011 The annual RLIF Awards dinner was held at the Tower of London and Smith was named hooker of the year.

Following Darren Lockyer's retirement at the end of the 2011 season, Smith became captain of both Australia and Queensland. He captained both sides to the 2012 ANZAC Test and 2012 State of Origin series victories respectively. At the 2012 Dally M Awards Smith was named the NRL's hooker of the year. He captained Storm to victory in the 2012 NRL Grand Final over the Canterbury-Bankstown Bulldogs. Smith also received the Rugby League International Federation's international player of the year award for 2012.

World Cup success (2013–2016) 

In early 2013, Smith captained the Storm to victory in the 2013 World Club Challenge over Leeds earning the title of world champions.
Smith captained Australia in the 2013 ANZAC Test and played at hooker. He kicked four goals from six attempts in what was the first test match ever played in Canberra.
After victory in the third and deciding game of the 2013 State of Origin series Smith was awarded the Wally Lewis Medal for player of the series, in which he captained the Queensland team which extended their record winning streak to 8 years.

On 9 June 2013, Smith played his 250th game for the Melbourne Storm, the second only player to have achieved that feat.

Queensland's win in Game III of the 2014 State of Origin series made Smith the first player in State of Origin history to win 20 games.

On 30 November 2013, Smith captained Australia to a dominant 34 to 2 win against New Zealand in the 2013 Rugby League World Cup Final ensuring the Australian side went through the entire tournament undefeated.

In November 2014, in the Four Nations game against England, Smith became just the sixth player to appear for Australia in 40 test matches.

On 9 July 2015, Smith captained Queensland to a 2 to 1 series win against New South Wales winning game three emphatically by 52 – 6. It was Smiths' 9th series win in ten years and his fourth series win as captain. At series end, Smith had equalled Darren Lockyer for most Queensland appearances with 36 and received his fifth man of the match award in game one to sit in equal second behind Wally Lewis for most man of the match awards in State of Origin.

On 17 July 2015, Smith became the Melbourne Storms' first 300-game player and only the 24th player in the history of the NRL to achieve such a feat. As of April 2017, Smith is one of only three current NRL players to have eclipsed 300 NRL games.

On 22 June 2016, Smith captained Queensland to their 10th series win in 11 years over New South Wales. Smith was awarded his sixth man of the match award in game 2 of Origin and was awarded the Wally Lewis medal as the player of the series for the fourth time at series end.

Setting records, World Cup and Premiership success (2017–2019) 
On 10 March 2017, Smith reached 2000 career points in a match against the New Zealand Warriors, becoming the first forward, the first Queenslander, and just the fifth player in history to have achieved the milestone.

On 30 July 2017, Smith became only the 3rd player in NRL history to play 350 games, behind Darren Lockyer (355) and equal with Terry Lamb. On 9 September, he played his 356th match and thereby became NRL's most capped player of all time.

On 2 December 2017, he captained the Kangaroos to another World Cup victory, defeating England in the final 6–0. He was also named in the team of the tournament.

On 30 March 2018, during the round 4 fixture against the Sharks, Smith was sent to the sin bin for backchatting. This was Smith's first sinbinning in his career and the Storm lost the game 14–4 in a match that had 33 penalties in total.

On 15 May 2018, Smith announced his retirement from all representative football, making him unavailable for Queensland or Australian selection.

In July 2019, he became the first NRL player to play 400 games. The Herald Sun marked the occasion with a front-page photograph by Mark Stewart at AAMI Park showing Smith and the only four others to achieve the feat in Australia, all Australian rules footballers: North Melbourne's Brent Harvey (the AFL/VFL leader in games played with 432), Essendon's Dustin Fletcher, Hawthorn's Michael Tuck and Richmond's Kevin Bartlett. For perspective, only one NRL or AFL player has since replicated the feat: Shaun Burgoyne of Port Adelaide and Hawthorn in 2021.

More Premiership success in COVID-affected year and retirement (2020–2021) 
The Melbourne Storm 2020 NRL season saw Smith captain the team for his 13th consecutive year. The season was suspended indefinitely on 23 March 2020 due to the ongoing coronavirus pandemic; however, on 28 April 2020, the NRL announced it would recommence on 28 May as a 20-round competition with a revised draw. During the season, Smith landed 86 goals and scored a total of 184 points.

In Round 9, the Storm defeated the Canberra Raiders 20-14, with Smith reaching another milestone with 300 wins in the NRL. In Round 12, the Storm defeated the Knights in their 6th consecutive win, with Smith injuring his shoulder while scoring a try.

On 25 October 2020, Smith captained the Storm to another NRL Premiership, scoring 14 points including a try in a 26–20 Grand Final victory over the Penrith Panthers.

On 10 March 2021, the day before the start of the NRL season, Smith announced his retirement from professional rugby league.

Honours 

Individual
 2x Dally M Medal best and fairest player: 2006, 2017
 9x Dally M Hooker of the Year: 2006, 2008, 2011, 2012, 2013, 2016, 2017, 2019, 2020
 1x NRL – Most points in a season by a hooker: 2006 (192)
 4x Wally Lewis Medal (State of Origin): 2007, 2011, 2013, 2016
 4x Dally M Representative Player of the Year: 2007, 2011, 2013, 2016
 2x Rugby League World Golden Boot Award: 2007, 2017
 5x Dally M Captain of the Year: 2011, 2013, 2017, 2018, 2019
 8x Melbourne Storm Player of the Year: 2005, 2006, 2007, 2011, 2012, 2013, 2017, 2020
 4x Melbourne Storm Forward of the Year (Award introduced in 2012): 2014, 2015, 2016, 2019
 1x Melbourne Storm Rookie of the Year: 2003
 400 games in the NRL: 2019
 300 game wins in the NRL: 2020
 40 finals appearances: 2020
 Melbourne Storm Captain: 327 games (2006–2020)
 Queensland Captain: 21 games (2008, 2012–2017)
 Australian Captain: 33 games (2007–2017)

Club
 3x NRL Grand Final Winners: 2012, 2017, 2020
 4x Minor Premiership (J. J. Giltinan Shield): 2011, 2016, 2017, 2019
 4x NRL Grand Final Runner-Up: 2006, 2008, 2016, 2018
 11x State of Origin Winners (Queensland): 2006, 2007, 2008, 2009, 2010, 2011, 2012, 2013, 2015, 2016, 2017
 3x World Club Challenge Winners: 2010, 2013, 2018

Statistics

NRL 

 Statistics are correct to the end of the 2020 NRL Season.

* = Unfinished season

State of Origin

Australia

Personal life 
Smith has three children with his long-term partner Barbara Johnson, whom he married in late 2011: two daughters and a son, he also supports the Hawthorn Football Club, and is an avid car enthusiast who is an ambassador for Holden Special Vehicles as well as an ambassador for the Ovarian Cancer Awareness campaign.

Notes

References

External links

Melbourne Storm profile 
Smith takes Golden Boot award
2017 RLWC profile
Cameron Smith writes on PlayersVoice

1983 births
Living people
Australia national rugby league team captains
Australia national rugby league team players
Australian rugby league commentators
Australian rugby league players
Junior Kangaroos players
Melbourne Storm players
Members of the Order of Australia
Norths Devils players
NRL All Stars players
Queensland Rugby League State of Origin captains
Queensland Rugby League State of Origin players
Rugby league hookers
Rugby league players from Logan, Queensland